Ostad (“Master”) Mahmoud Zoufonoun (Persian: محمود ذوالفنون, sometimes pronounced "Zolfonoon" or "Zolfonun"; 1 January 1920 – 19 October 2013) was an Iranian-born American musician accomplished in the art of Persian traditional music.

Life and career
Zoufonoun's interest in music began after he secretly listened to his father (Habib Zoufonoun) playing and teaching the tar. Habib began teaching his son the instrument at age 8. Aged twelve, already having become a local teacher for tar, Zoufonoun became interested in the violin.  Since he was unable to obtain an instrument of his own he designed and made his own instrument.

In the 1930s Zoufonoun moved to Shiraz where he learned musical notes from a clarinet teacher and took lessons in the violin. In 1936 (aged 16) Zoufonoun, at the prompting of his first violin teacher Mr. Vaziritabar, moved to Tehran where he took lessons from Rouben Gregorian.  In the early 1940s Zoufonoun began playing solo's on Radio Iran. In 1942 he helped form Anjomane Mooseeghee Melli where he met Rouhollah Khaleghi (who conducted the orchestra).

Zoufonoun worked as a soloist, composer, arranger and conductor at the National Radio and Television. He was a member of the “Golha orchestra”. Over the course of his career he has made efforts to compile, transcribe a compilation of regional folk songs, modes, and styles to date. The work is currently uncompleted.

Following his retirement in 1976 from the National Radio and Television, Mahmoud and his family emigrated to the US. He continued to teach and compose and perform traditional Persian music, usually with his sons as the Zoufonoun Ensemble.

Teaching
Zoufonoun also taught violin. Until his death, he gave lessons in his private studio and previously taught at the National School for Iranian Music (of which he was a founding member), The Shabaneh Adult Art School, Institute for the Arts, The University of Tehran, and The Danesh-e Sarah-e Honar.

Honors

On January 20, 2007, Z Venue, an arts non-profit organization located in Santa Clara County, presented "A Tribute to Mahmoud Zoufonoun" in the Palace of Fine Arts Theatre, San Francisco.

Notable compositions 

 Concerto Dashti for Symphony Orchestra
 Tareneh Bayateh Tork (Golha Orchestra; Banan singing)
 Taraneh Mahour: "Gol-o-Zaari" (Lyrics by Hafez)
 Naghd-e-Sufi: Suite in Rastpanjgah, including several original Taranehs ("Bovad-aya", "Naghd-e-Sufi", "Baba Taher")
 Faash-Mee-Gooyam: Suite in Chahargah, including original Taranehs ("Sheydaee", "Narm Narmak", "Faash-Mee-Gooyam")
 Heelat-Raha-Kon: Suite in Oshagh, including original Taraneh "Heelat-Raha-Kon"
 Anthem in Chahargah: "Vatan" (Lyrics by Simin Behbahani)

See also 
 Jalal Zolfonun (Zoufonoun)
 Composers of Traditional Persian Music

References

External links 

 
 Mahmoud Zoufonoun's recorded music: Naghde Sufi
 Article in Persian on Mahmoud Zoufonoun
 Mahmoud Zoufonoun playing "Harbi" from his album, "Naghde Sufi"
Mahmoud Zoufonoun solo intro; Zoufonoun ensemble playing "Boyad Aya" from "Naghde Sufi"
Mahmoud Zoufonoun playing "Mavalian" from his album, "Naghde Sufi"

People from Abadeh
1920 births
2013 deaths
20th-century Iranian musicians
Iranian violinists
Deaths from dementia in California
Deaths from Alzheimer's disease
20th-century violinists
Iranian emigrants to the United States